Acevedo is one of the 21 municipalities (municipios) that makes up the Venezuelan state of Miranda and, according to a 2007 population estimate by the National Institute of Statistics of Venezuela, the municipality has a population of 88,289.  The town of Caucagua is the municipal seat of the Acevedo Municipality.

Demographics
The Acevedo Municipality, according to a 2007 population estimate by the National Institute of Statistics of Venezuela, has a population of 88,289 (up from 75,868 in 2000). This amounts to 3.1% of the state's population.

Government
The mayor of the Acevedo Municipality is Juan José Aponte Mijares, elected on October 31, 2004, with 47% of the vote.  He replaced Vicente Apicella shortly after the elections.  The municipality is divided into eight parishes; Caucagua, Aragüita, Arévalo González, Capaya, El Café, Marizapa, Panaquire, and Ribas.

References

Municipalities of Miranda (state)